Reload or Reloaded may refer to:

Film
 Reloaded (2009 film), a Nigerian film
 Reloaded (2017 film), a Hindi-language film
 Reload (film), a 2019 Sri Lankan comedy thriller film

Music
 Reload, project by Mark Pritchard

Albums
 Reloaded (DJ BoBo album) (2013)
 Reloaded (Green Apple Quick Step album) (1995)
 Reloaded (Alexz Johnson album) (2011)
 Reload (Tom Jones album) (1999)
 Reloaded (Roc Marciano album) (2012)
 Reload (Metallica album) (1997)
 Reload (EP), a 2020 EP by NCT Dream
 Reloaded (Rascalz album) (2002)
 Reloaded: 20 Number 1 Hits, a 2015 album by Blake Shelton

Songs
 "Reload" (Sebastian Ingrosso and Tommy Trash song) (2012)
 "Reload" (Wiley song) (2013)
 "Reload", a 2003 song by Rob Zombie on The Matrix Reloaded: The Album

Other uses
 Reloading, the act of requesting the displayed web page again from a server, typically to look for changes.
 Another term for Handloading, the small scale manufacture of firearm cartridges; specifically when using previously fired cartridges.
 Reload (energy drink), an energy drink by Bigg Juice Industries, Inc
 Reloaded (warez), a warez group founded in 2004
 REsource LOcation And Discovery Framing (RELOAD), an internet signalling protocol
 Re-Loaded, a 1996 shooter video game, successor of Loaded

See also
 Reloading scam